The Palluau Lake is a freshwater body of the Lac-Ashuapmushuan, Quebec unorganized territory in the Regional County Municipality (RCM) Le Domaine-du-Roy, north-west of Saguenay-Lac-Saint-Jean administrative region, in province of Quebec, in Canada.

This lake is included entirely in the Township of Buade. The Palluau Lake is located on the west side outside the boundary of the Ashuapmushuan Wildlife Reserve. It is about halfway between Marquette Lake (located in the East) and Frontenac Lake (Milieu River) (located on the West side).

Forestry is the main economic activity of the sector. Recreational tourism activities come second.

The forest road R0212 (East-West) passes the north side of Lake Palluau. It will join to the East, the route 167 connecting Chibougamau and Saint-Félicien, Quebec, as well as the railway of the Canadian National Railway. Other secondary forest roads serve the southern vicinity of the lake.

The surface of Lac Palluau is usually frozen from early November to mid-May, however, safe ice circulation is generally from mid-November to mid-April.

Geography

Toponymy
The toponym "Lac Palluau" was formalized on December 5, 1968, by the Commission de toponymie du Québec, when it was created.

Notes and references

See also 

Lakes of Saguenay–Lac-Saint-Jean
Le Domaine-du-Roy Regional County Municipality